Hipster or Hipsters may refer to:
 Hipster (contemporary subculture), composed of affluent or middle class youth
 Hipster (1940s subculture), referring to aficionados of jazz, in particular bebop, which became popular in the early 1940s
 "Hipster" (Space Ghost Coast to Coast), a television episode
 Hipster PDA, a paper-based personal organizer
 Hipsters (TV series), Australian TV documentary series
 Low-rise (fashion), a style of clothing designed to sit low on, or below, the hips
 Stilyagi (film), a 2008 Russian film known as Hipsters in the English release

See also
 Bondi Hipsters, Australian mockumentary series on YouTube